Valery Shein (born 23 November 1945) is a Soviet alpine skier. He competed in three events at the 1964 Winter Olympics.

References

1945 births
Living people
Soviet male alpine skiers
Olympic alpine skiers of the Soviet Union
Alpine skiers at the 1964 Winter Olympics
Sportspeople from Perm, Russia